Ebony Film Corporation was a film company established in Chicago in 1915 as Historical Feature Film Company. Its films were distributed "exclusively" by General Film Company. The company's films and its depictions of African Americans caused outrage and opposition from African Americans. The company used a logo of a monkey in blackface. The business folded in 1919.

The company produced two-reel Westerns, newsreels, and documentaries as well as several short comedy films with African American casts depicting degrading racial stereotypes. 
A Reckless Rover is a 1918 slapstick comedy film that survives in the Library of Congress' collection. The film credits C. N. David as its director and features a man who does not want to get out of bed pursued by bumbling Keystone Cops style antics. He is put to work in a Chinese laundry and various antics ensue.
Sam Robinson starred in several of Ebony's slapstick comedy films. Luther J. Pollard was credited as a producer.

One of the company's advertisements listed its film offerings and teased the coming of a film adaptation of Eldred Kurtz Means' story "Good Luck in Old Clothes" s from the Tickfall Tales series.  The film was produced.

Filmography
The Shooting Star (1915)
Two Knights of Vaudeville (1915), extant
Spying the Spy (1915), an extant  detective comedy that parodies The Birth of a Nation
Shine Johnson and the Rabbit's Foot (1917)
Wrong All Around (1917)
Dat Blackhand Waitah Man (1917)
A Reckless Rover (1918), extant
Mercy, the Mummy Mumbled (1918), extant
The Bully (1918)
A Black Sherlock Holmes (1918)
Black and Tan Mix Up (1918)
Some Baby (1918)
A Busted Romance (1918)
Firing the Fakir (1918)
When You Hit, Hit Hard (1918)
Are Working Girls Safe? (1918)
The Porters
The Janitor
A Milk Fed Hero (1918)
Busted Romance (1918)
Spooks (1917)

See also
Lincoln Motion Picture Company
REOL Productions

References

External links
Ebony Film Company films on IMDb
Ebony Film Corporation at daaracarchive

Film production companies of the United States